Iliochori ("Village of the Sun", before 1927: Δοβρίνοβο - Dovrinovo) is one of the Zagori villages in northwest Greece. It is located in the municipal unit of Tymfi in the northern part of the regional unit of Ioannina. According to a local legend, the village was founded as Rasciana, on the river of the same name. However, that site was abandoned because of a lack of drinking water, and the inhabitants scattered to found Iliochori and the nearby town of Laista (ancient Lisinitza). Iliochori was traditionally an agricultural village, with husbandry and cultivation of barley and vetch being among its primary areas of economic activity. Viticulture was also prominent, and the village produced a wine, Dobrovino, that gave it its original name. Caravans leaving from Iliochori carried products from the region to the Balkans for trade. The town suffered severe damage in both World War II and the Greek Civil War and lost a large portion of its population during the 1940s as a result.

History

Origin 
The origin of the town is not completely clear. From some historical findings it seems that in the 11th century BC, the local inhabitants formed several small isolated communities, at the sites of Rascianà, Lipochori, Koukourounzu and Souri. Later on, probably for several reasons including drinkable water, the inhabitants abandoned the place and constructed the town in the actual "Dobrinovo". That Slavic name, of the AD 14th century, means "Dobri+novo" ("good + new"). However, not all the inhabitants moved to Iliochori. Some of them settled in Laista (14 km or 9 miles away) that in this period was called Lisinitza. During the period of the Slavic hegemony in the Epirus (AD 6th-7th century), the town of Dobrinovo already existed, as it turns out from the Slavic evidences.

In the 14th century, the Monastery of Panaghia was constructed. In 1431, as the "Vrisochoritan" Nikolaos Exarchos reports in his book To Ntombrinovo, the Turkish administration counts 1180 inhabitants. In the following years, it kept developing either as more inhabitants or as increased prosperity. Evidence shows the existence of a document that contained a convention made with a doctor of Pades in order to offer medical assistance. The convention that in the period of one year established that the municipality of Dobrinovo would have paid only the wage to the doctor in order to offer free medical attendance to the inhabitants, who have only paid for the medicines. The documents were signed in 1616, but they were destroyed with the fire of the municipality by the Nazis in 1943.

In 1812, the French consul Pouqueville visited the region and reported that in the town of Dobrinovo, he found 750 inhabitants. After few years, since 1815 in Dobrinovo, there was a continuation of Greek schools. Lessons took place in the Monastery of Panaghia and later in some private houses. During the year there happened the first great destruction of the community of the inhabitants caused by bubonic plague disease. The town had numerous victims, and the inhabitants sheltered themselves in the mountains in order to escape from the disease.

In 1819 the Metropolita of Ioannina Gabriel visited the communities which suffered from the disease, and in the town he met 160 inhabitants. In a letter of Ath. Psalidis dated 12-2-1823, sent to Movrokordatos, he described the situation of the Epirus and Tessally, under the Turkish occupation, showing an armed struggle for liberation. It reports that in the town of Dobrinovo where people live, they were able to carry weapons. The town of Dobrinovo in that period used the school separated for the boys and the girls and was constructed using the aqueduct that brought water to the town and bridges that opened new roads. The inhabitants of Dobrinovo travelled a lot and became traders, but they did not forget their town and they contributed for its development. The Greek newspaper published in Constantinopolis, speaks about 1200 inhabitants in the town of Dobrinovo. Unfortunately for the town, there followed a period of economic decadence. The Balkan wars in 1912, then the First World War, blocked the trade activities that the Iliochorites had created with the countries like Bulgaria, Serbia, Montenegro, until Russia. Later with the arrival of the Spanish flu pulled down on all the towns including Dobrinovo (Iliochori) with numerous victims.

Under the dominion of the Turks 
From 1463 until 1912, Iliochori was under the dominion of the Turks, who had granted to all the towns of Zagoria a governmental autonomy with the payment of taxes. The town grew rich with the maximum development between 1870 and 1900.

From 1916 the population was decimated by "Asian flu". The inhabitants of Iliochori lived by breeding sheep and cows, and agriculture, cultivating grain, barley and vetch. They dedicated great care also to viticulture, producing a good wine. However, they were also traders, and in the spring left in caravan with mules and horses, carrying of the goods that they above all sold in the countries of the Balkans, where many had constructed true and economic fortunes. They came back to Iliochori at the end of autumn, to spend the winter with their families. In the winter months, the shepherds were dedicated to the handicrafts, forming itinerant guilds of masons and sculptors in wood that traveled the Balkans selling their goods.

Until 1914 in Iliochori there was the school of the chassis situated over the road of the current city hall, where the girls learned to weave. The building belonged to the Gianussi family that had donated it to the city council; beyond the weaving school there were the elementary school, the primary and secondary schools that were found in the same building. In these schools, there were female teachers for the girls and male teachers for the boys. In 1912 the building was burnt, and in 1924 started its reconstruction, which was finished in 1927. The first master was Papasisis.

Second World War and name change 
After the 1920 the houses inhabited were 160.
In 1926, the town officially changed name from "Dobrinovo" and was assigned the name "Iliochori" that in Greek means "Town of the Sun".

During the Second World War, the Germans arrived at Iliochori in 1943 and burnt a large part of the houses of the town.
In 1944 another battalion of German entered the town, searching carefully without damaging it.

The town has endured large damages during the Greek Civil War from 1946 to 1949 and many inhabitants emigrated. Till World War II, most Iliochorians used to emigrate mainly to Thessaly. Outside Greece, Iliochorians used to emigrate to Bulgaria, Wallachia and the U.S. Seems that in 1972, there was filmed an old Greek movie Oi Xenitemenoi.

From 1990 to 2010 
From 1990 many original inhabitants of the place, coming from several parts, Athens, Thessaloniki, Ioannina, Larissa and also from Italy, had begun to repopulate and re-evaluate the town, constructing new houses. In the period, many initiatives of building reconstruction were started, like the renovation of the church of Aghios Nikolaos. In 1992 was completed the portion of the road from the locality Gyftokampos to Iliochori, allowing a fast connection to the village. Always in this period, there was a small committee for the creation of the tourist attraction like waterfall of "Balta Stringa", in the locality Rascianà that attracts visitors also from France.

In 2002, the first website was launched in English and Italian and later became also in French, Spanish and later in Greek version. In 2008 another website in the Greek language was launched, becoming the first village of Zagori in 2009 with two official websites. The door of the church of Aghios Minas had been replaced with a new one in the summer 2009 by the donation of countryman Georgios Polimeris. In October 2009, SKY TV set up a documentary in the waterfall of "Balta Stringa" and around Iliochori. In 2010, after many years on the initiative of the Cultural Association Iliochori, "The Ntomprinovo" revived, successfully, the reunion of Iliochoriton everywhere in lakes of the pit.

Recent history 
In 2010, Iliochori start to be on Social Media, in fact they opened page in Facebook, Twitter a Telegram Channel, Youtube, Vimeo and Instagram. These channels allow to share news, videos in real time and connect all the inhabitants and iliochorites who live outside or abroad.

Local main events - Panigyri
Each 20 July: (Prophet Elia): This holiday is in honour of the Prophet Elia of the Patron Saint of Iliochori. It is a holiday of religion and folklore, in fact the women of the town, a few days in advance, they go to the church situated in front of the town, to prepare it suitably for the holiday. The folklore holiday starts on the evening of 19 July. At the center of the square, the Iliochoriti start the traditional dances of the Epirus, and in particular (peculiar) of the region of Zagori, with the music of the orchestra.

The morning of 20 July begins the religious holiday: The faithful cover by walking the road that from the town brings to the church of the prophet Elia: at the end of the function; they go to the houses of the people that celebrate the name day for the wishes. Always the same evening on the main square of the town there are again the traditional dances until the first light of the morning. This holiday is occasion of many people originally from this place but living far away, to go back to Iliochori. The holiday attracts many visitors from the towns, eager to taste typical dishes and wines of the region of Zagori.

Location and climate
Iliochori is surrounded by conifer forests and rivers at the foothills of Gamila of the Tymphis mountain range, and borders the Vikos–Aoös National Park. It is built on a steep slope between very tall trees in a green area, with much running water and stone bridges. The village of Iliochori also has a small post office and a small school with a nice square re-made as a plaka.

Transportation
The village of Iliochori is frequently connected from Ioannina by the transit communications company KTEL (Greece). From the other main Greek cities, like Athens and Thessaloniki, the Via Egnatia highway passes by Ioannina. The closer airport is the Ioannina National Airport, going out from Ioannina in the direction of Konitsa. After  on the right, there is the cross-roads that after  will bring to the town of Iliochori.

Tourism

In October 2009, one of the television stations of Ioannina shot a documentary about this main attraction and in the village.
 In locality Gyftokampos, every year, on the first weekend of August, the descendants of the ancient tribe of Sarachazani, great breeders, congregate for a great festivity that begins on Friday afternoon. They come from Greece, Romania, Bulgaria, and elsewhere in the Balkans. On their arrival they set up the tents and light large bonfires for the preparation of the roasts and in order to warm themselves because at night, the temperature goes down.
 Another sight is the Rascianitis river that flows in the valley of the town, where one can go fishing. 
 The bridge of Peccios in stone probably laughet to the period is the Ottoman empire and has become also one turist attraction.

In popular culture
The 1990 movie "Η τελευταία αρκούδα του Πίνδου" ("The Last Bear of Pindos") was about a migrant from Iliochori, returning from Stuttgart (Germany) to his home village.

Notable Iliochorites
 Iraklis Retos, named Mayor in Trikala from June 1946 until August 1950.
 Nikolaos Bellos from Iliochori in Zagori, died in Ioannina in 1948; he was one of the benefactors of Ioannina.
 Giorgios Mellis "Official Knight of the Order to the Merit of the Italian Republic"

Bibliography

External links
https://iliochori.wordpress.com/, in Greek
www.iliochori.com, in Greek, English, Italian, French, Spanish

Media
Facebook
Twitter
Youtube
Vimeo
Instagram

References 

Aromanian settlements in Greece
Ioannina (regional unit)
Populated places in Ioannina (regional unit)
Villages in Greece
Municipalities of Epirus (region)
History of Epirus
Epirus
Provinces of Greece
Pindus
Epirus
Zagori